Mayega is a rural locality (a village) in Prilukskoye Rural Settlement, Vologodsky District, Vologda Oblast, Russia. The population was 15 as of 2002.

Geography 
Mayega is located 12 km northeast of Vologda (the district's administrative centre) by road. Semyonkovo-2 is the nearest rural locality.

References 

Rural localities in Vologodsky District